Enshi railway station, is a  railway station  in Enshi City, Enshi Tujia and Miao Autonomous Prefecture, Hubei Province, People's Republic of China. It is part of the Yichang–Wanzhou railway.

On 22 December 2012, the Yichang–Wanzhou railway started operations, with the maiden journey from Enshi railway station to Yichang city.

The station is close to Enshi Xujiaping Airport, but is not connected.

References

Railway stations in Hubei